Constance of Aragon (4 April 1300 - 19 October 1327) (sometimes called Constanza) was an Aragon by birth and the princess of Villena by marriage. She was the daughter of King James II of Aragon and his second wife Queen Blanche of Anjou, a Neapolitan princess. She was also the maternal grandmother of King Ferdinand I of Portugal through her daughter Constance.

Biography
Constance was born on April 4, 1300. She was the fourth daughter of James II of Aragon, son of King Peter III of Aragon and Queen Constance II of Sicily, and Blanche of Anjou, daughter of King Charles II of Naples and princess Maria of Hungary. She had many siblings, including Alfonso IV of Aragon.

At the age of six, she was engaged to Juan Manuel, Prince of Villena. They were married six years later. She was his second wife, as he had been previously married to Elizabeth of Majorca. She lived in the Villena Castle post her engagement and prior to her marriage. She died in 1327.

Mariage and Descent
She married Don Juan Manuel of Leon-Castile-Galicia in 1312. They had three children:
Constance of Villena, Queen of Castile-León, then wife of the Portuguese heir Peter
Beatrice of Villena, died young
Manuel of Villena, died young

Ancestry

References 

Information has been collected from the Spanish and Catalan Wikipedia articles.

infanta
infanta
infanta
Daughters of kings